The 2019–20 Copa de la Reina de Fútbol was the 38th edition of the Spanish women's association football national cup.

Format changes
The format did not change from the previous season, as it is contested by all Primera División teams.

The calendar was defined on 13 December 2019.

Schedule and format

Notes
Single-match rounds ending in a tie will be decided in extra time; and if it persists, by a penalty shootout.

Bracket

Round of 16

Draw

Matches

Quarterfinals

Semifinals
''The semi-finals were originally slated to be played on 17 and 18 March 2020 but were suspended due to the COVID-19 pandemic, they were played on 7 and 8 October 2020

Final

Top goalscorers
In bold, players that still continue in competition.

References

External links
Royal Spanish Football Federation
Copa de la Reina at La Liga website

Women
Copa de la Reina
Copa de la Reina de Fútbol seasons
Copa de la Reina de Fútbol